Triarthria setipennis is a species of tachinid fly which parasitizes other insects, including earwigs.

Distribution
Albania, Andorra, Belarus, Austria, Belgium, Bulgaria, Czech Republic, Denmark, Finland, France, Germany, Greece, Hungary, Italy, Lithuania, Norway, Poland, Romania, Russia, Slovakia,  Spain, Sweden, Switzerland, Netherlands, Ukraine, United Kingdom.

It has been introduced from Europe in the 1920s to control Forficula auricularia (European earwig) and it is established in British Columbia, Washington, Oregon, California, Idaho, Nevada, Utah, Newfoundland, New Hampshire, Massachusetts.

References

Tachininae
Diptera of Europe
Diptera of North America
Insects described in 1810